Emanuel Joel Amoroso (born 8 January 1988) is an Argentine professional footballer who plays as a right midfielder for Royal Pari.

Career
Amoroso had a youth spell with Centenario de Venado Tuerto, before beginning his senior career in Torneo Argentino C with Sportivo Rivadavia. In 2011, Amoroso joined fellow Torneo Argentino C team Jorge Newbery. He scored four goals in eighteen matches in his first season, which ended with promotion to Torneo Argentino B. After twenty-four appearances and seven goals in Torneo Argentino B, Amoroso was signed by Primera B Nacional's Ferro Carril Oeste in June 2012. A goalless tie with Olimpo on 13 August saw him make his professional debut, which was the first of nineteen matches for the club throughout 2012–13.

On 21 July 2013, Amoroso joined Unión Mar del Plata of Torneo Argentino A. He went on to scored nine times in forty-three games for Unión Mar del Plata over the course of 2013–14 and 2014. In January 2015, Argentine Primera División side Olimpo signed Amoroso. He made his debut on 7 March against Rosario Central, prior to scoring his first two goals in November during matches versus Banfield and Quilmes. On 6 July 2016, Amoroso signed for fellow top-flight club Newell's Old Boys. One goal in twenty-eight appearances followed, which preceded Amoroso departing on loan in September 2017 to Belgrano.

Amoroso scored his first goal for Belgrano on 17 November, netting an 89th-minute winner away to parent club Newell's Old Boys. He returned to them in June 2018, prior to terminating his contract in the succeeding February to subsequently join San Luis. Amoroso remained for seven months, notching goals against Deportes Melipilla and Deportes Valdivia in the process. On 6 July, Amoroso switched Chile for Peru by agreeing terms with Melgar.

Career statistics
.

References

External links

1988 births
Living people
Footballers from Rosario, Santa Fe
Argentine footballers
Association football midfielders
Argentine expatriate footballers
Expatriate footballers in Chile
Expatriate footballers in Peru
Argentine expatriate sportspeople in Chile
Argentine expatriate sportspeople in Peru
Torneo Argentino C players
Torneo Argentino B players
Primera Nacional players
Torneo Argentino A players
Torneo Federal A players
Argentine Primera División players
Primera B de Chile players
Peruvian Primera División players
Ferro Carril Oeste footballers
Unión de Mar del Plata footballers
Olimpo footballers
Newell's Old Boys footballers
Club Atlético Belgrano footballers
San Luis de Quillota footballers
FBC Melgar footballers